Akec Tong Aleu was the first governor of defunct Tonj state. He is serving as a minister of cabinet affairs in Warrap state. has been the Governor of Tonj State, South Sudan since 24 December 2015. He is the first governor of the state, which was created by President Salva Kiir on 2 October 2015.

References

Living people
Political office-holders in South Sudan
Year of birth missing (living people)